The Pinatar Cup, by full name Pinatar Cup by IAST SPORTS, is an invitational women's association football tournament held in March in San Pedro del Pinatar, Region of Murcia, Spain. In the first edition (in 2020), it was contested by Iceland, Northern Ireland, Scotland and Ukraine. The tournament is organized by the company called IAST SPORTS originally from Slovakia.

Scotland won the inaugural contest (2020) after defeating Northern Ireland in the last game with goals from Abbi Grant and Erin Cuthbert.

It is played in late February or early March, at the same time as the Algarve Cup, the Arnold Clark Cup, the Cup of Nations, the Cyprus Women's Cup, the Istria Cup, the SheBelieves Cup, the Tournoi de France, the Turkish Women's Cup and the Women's Revelations Cup.

Summary

Participating nations

References

External links
Official website

 
International women's association football competitions hosted by Spain
International women's association football invitational tournaments
Recurring sporting events established in 2020
2020 establishments in Spain
March sporting events